Colonel John Duncan Grant  (28 December 1877 – 20 February 1967) was a British Indian Army officer who was awarded the Victoria Cross, the highest award for gallantry in the face of the enemy that can be awarded to British and Commonwealth forces.

Victoria Cross
Born at Roorkee, northern India, and educated in England at Cheltenham College, Grant attended the Royal Military College, Sandhurst and after passing out was appointed as a Second Lieutenant to the "Unattached List ... with a view to [his] appointment to the Indian Staff Corps." He was promoted to Lieutenant in 1900. He joined the 8th Gurkha Rifles which was part of the British expedition to Tibet in 1903–04. On 6 July 1904 his actions at the storming of the Gyantse Dzong (fortress) led to the award of the Victoria Cross:

Later service
Grant was promoted to captain in 1907 and to major in 1916. During World War I he served in the Persian Gulf in 1915–16, France and Belgium in 1917 and Mesopotamia in 1918. After the war he served in Afghanistan in 1919, and then as lieutenant colonel in command of the 13th Rajputs in the Waziristan campaign (1919–1920). He was awarded the Distinguished Service Order "for distinguished service rendered in the Field with the Waziristan Force, 1920–1921." He was Assistant Adjutant General at the headquarters of the Army of India 1925–28, and Deputy Director of the Auxiliary and Territorial Force in India 1928–29. He retired in 1929 with the rank of colonel and was appointed a Companion of the Order of the Bath in the King's Birthday Honours of that year. He was ceremonial Colonel of the 10th Gurkha Rifles 1934–47.

Personal life
Grant married Kathleen Freyer (born 1883), the daughter of Sir Peter Freyer, an Irish doctor who served in the Indian Medical Service. They had two children.

He died in Tunbridge Wells, aged 89, and was cremated and buried at the Kent and Sussex Crematorium and Cemetery.

References
GRANT, Col John Duncan, Who Was Who, A & C Black, 1920–2008; online edn, Oxford University Press, Dec 2007, retrieved 27 October 2012

External links
Location of grave (Kent)
John GRANT of Cheltenham College

1877 births
1967 deaths
People from Haridwar
People educated at Cheltenham College
British Indian Army officers
British military personnel of the British expedition to Tibet
Indian Army personnel of World War I
British military personnel of the Third Anglo-Afghan War
British military personnel of the Waziristan Campaign
British recipients of the Victoria Cross
Companions of the Distinguished Service Order
Companions of the Order of the Bath
Military personnel of British India
British people in colonial India